Libuše Stratilová (8 December 1933 - 17 June 2001) was a Czech academic painter and printmaker.

Stratilová studied at the Academy of Arts, Architecture and Design in Prague - 1959 under Karel Svolinský. Since 1961 she had been employed as professor at SOŠV (now Výtvarná škola Václava Hollara in Prague). Her work developed from expressive realism and lyrical abstraction to spiritual imagination. She has produced book illustrations and architectural renderings in addition to prints. Two of her works are in the collection of the National Gallery of Art. She has held 12 individual exhibitions, and taken park in 23 collective  exhibitions in Great Britain, Poland and Holland. She is also represented in public collections - Gallery  of Graphic Art in Oloumouc and Dr. Zavřel Gallery in the Netherlands.

References

1933 births
2001 deaths
Czech printmakers
Women printmakers
20th-century Czech artists
20th-century printmakers
20th-century Czech women artists
21st-century Czech artists
21st-century printmakers
21st-century Czech women artists
Czech feminists
Czech graphic designers
Czechoslovak artists
Expressionist artists
Czech illustrators
Academy of Arts, Architecture and Design in Prague alumni